Kanachak is an area/sector of  Akhnoor Tehsil, Jammu district, Jammu and Kashmir, India. It lies along the international border (IB) with Pakistan.

References

Jammu district